Chip may refer to:

Food
 Chip (snack), thin sliced food, cooked until crunchy
 Potato chip, a thin slice of potato that has been deep fried or baked until crunchy, called a "crisp" in some countries, such as the UK.
 Chips (hot food), fried potato batons also called french fries
 Game chips, thin deep-fried slices of potato served as an accompaniment to roast gamebirds
 Chocolate chip, small chunk of sweetened chocolate

Sports and gaming
 Chip (association football), a type of football shot
 Chip (golf), a type of golf shot
 Casino token, often referred to as a chip

People and fictional characters
 Chip (name), a list of people and fictional characters with either the given name or nickname
 Chip (rapper), English hip hop recording artist born Jahmaal Noel Fyffe in 1990
 King Chip (born 1986), stage name of American hip hop rapper Charles Jawanzaa Worth, formerly known as Chip tha Ripper
 Chip Douglas, American songwriter, musician, and record producer Douglas Hatlelid (born 1942)
 Chip Taylor, stage name of American songwriter James Wesley Voight (born 1940)
 Chip Fairway, a ring name of American professional wrestler Brett J. Keen (1972–2011)

Biology 

Chromatin immunoprecipitation (ChIP), a molecular biology method to map DNA sites
STUB1, a human gene also known as CHIP (C terminus of HSC70-Interacting Protein)

Computing 

 Chip, a monolithic integrated circuit without its packaging, a microchip
 An integrated circuit mounted on a surface mount chip carrier
 Chip (CDMA), the fundamental unit of transmission in CDMA
 CHIP (computer), Linux dev board built by Next Thing Co. and marketed as a miniature computer
 CHIP (programming language), based on Prolog
 CHIP-8, a video game programming language in the 1970s
 ChucK for iPhone/iPad (ChiP), a programming language used for music synthesis
Connected Home over IP (CHIP), a protocol for home automation

Finance
 Chip (stock market), description of stock of a particular quality
 Clearing House Interbank Payments System (CHIPS), a United States private clearing house for large-value transactions

Organizations and programs
 California Highway Patrol (CHiP), a law enforcement agency of California
 CHIP Holding, a German-based publishing house
 Children's Health Insurance Program (CHIP), a US federal government program
 Community Housing and Infrastructure Program  (CHIP), an Australian government funding program, along with its Community Development Employment Projects
 Masonic Child Identification Programs, a charitable initiative by North American Masonic lodges

Other uses
 Clonal hematopoiesis of indeterminate potential (CHIP)
 Chip, one of the mascots of the University of Colorado at Boulder
 Chip language, spoken in Nigeria
 Swarf, also known as chips, the debris or waste resulting from metalworking operations
 CHIP (magazine), a German computer magazine
 Chip-India, Indian edition of German computer magazine CHIP

See also
 "Chip Chip", a 1961 song written by Jeff Barry, Clifford Crawford, and Arthur Resnick and performed by Gene McDaniels
 Chips (disambiguation)
 Chipper (disambiguation)
 Chipping (disambiguation)
 Ch!pz, a Dutch band